Belvaux is a town in the commune of Sanem, in south-western Luxembourg.  , the town has a population of 5,113.  It is the administrative centre of Sanem commune.  Belvaux is the twelfth-largest town in Luxembourg, and the largest not to have a commune named after it.

Sanem
Towns in Luxembourg